Matzuva, also known as Metzuba, is a kibbutz in the Western Galilee in northern Israel. Located to the south of the development town of Shlomi, it falls under the jurisdiction of Mateh Asher Regional Council.

History
The village was established in 1940 by immigrants from Germany, members of the Maccabi HaTzair youth movement. It was named after the nearby Pi Matzuba known in antiquities, a place mentioned in the Tosefta (Shevi'it 4:8-ff.) and in the 3rd century Mosaic of Rehob. The name is believed to have been derived from mṣwbh, a Semitic root, meaning 'pyramid' or 'pyramidal pile'.

Economy
Due to economic problems, the kibbutz textile factory closed down in 2003.

See also
Matzuva attack

References

German-Jewish culture in Israel
Kibbutzim
Kibbutz Movement
Populated places established in 1940
Populated places in Northern District (Israel)
1940 establishments in Mandatory Palestine